The widow rockfish (Sebastes entomelas), or brown bomber, is a species of marine ray-finned fish belonging to the subfamily Sebastinae, the rockfishes, part of the family Scorpaenidae. It is found in the northeastern Pacific Ocean.

Taxonomy
The widow rockfish was first formally described as Sebastichthys entomelas in 1880 by the American ichthyologists David Starr Jordan and Charles Henry Gilbert with the type locality given as deepwater outside of Monterey Bay, California. Some authorities place this species in the subgenus Acutomentum. The specific name entomelas is a compound of entos meaning “within” and melas which means “black” an allusion to the “jet-black” peritoneum of this species.

Description
The widow rockfish has an elongate and compressed, scale covered body which has a depth which is around one third of its standard length. The head is relatively short, and the upper profile is slightly curved. The mouth is relatively small, the lower jaw projects slightly. The color is brassy brown over most of the body with the belly generally lighter in color, often with a reddish cast. The fin membranes, especially those in the anal and pectoral fins, are black. There are weak spines on the head and there are 13 spined and 14-16 soft rays in the dorsal fin while the anal fin has 3 spines and 8-10 soft rays.

Distribution and habitat
The widow rockfish occurs from Todos Santos Bay, Baja California, to Albatross Bank, in the Gulf of Alaska. Adult widow rockfishes are most abundant from British Columbia to northern California.

Biology
Widow rockfish feed on krill and copepods as juveniles while the adults feed on juvenile crabs, amphipods, krill, and small fishes. The juveniles are preyed upon by Chinook salmon (Oncorhynchus tshawytscha) and northern fur seals (Callorhinus ursinus). Widow rockfish may live to be 16 years old. As with other rockfish fertilization is internal and the young are born live.

Genetics
A potential PCR-RFLP genetic sex marker developed for gopher rockfish does not successfully distinguish male and female widow rockfish.

Fisheries
Widow rockfish fisheries are managed by NOAA Fisheries and the Pacific Fishery Management Council under the Pacific Coast Groundfish Fishery Management Plan. This allows for the issue of permits which limit entry to the fishery. There are limits to how much can be landed from each trip and there are closed seasons and areas closed to fisheries. It restricts the type of fishing gear which can be used to reduce bycatch and habytat destruction. It aklso provides for a trawl rationalisation catch share program which sets catch limits based on the population status of each species and a share of that limit is allocated to each fisherman, this can be shared with other fishermen. The rock is managed as part of the other rockfish complex in the Gulf of Alaska, although this species is not specifically targeted in Alaskan waters and only small amounts are landed as bycatch.

References

This article was copied from California Marine Sportfish by the California Department of Fish and Game, Marine Region; a public domain resource.

External links
EOL.org
itis.gov

Sebastes
Taxa named by David Starr Jordan
Taxa named by Charles Henry Gilbert
Fish described in 1880